Muricopsis is a genus of small predatory sea snails, marine gastropod mollusks in the rock snail family, Muricidae.

Species
According to the World Register of Marine Species (WoRMS), the following species with accepted names are included within the genus Muricopsis :

Species brought into synonymy 
 Muricopsis aliceae Petuch, 1987: synonym of Pygmaepterys aliceae (Petuch, 1987) (original combination)
 Muricopsis angolensis(Odhner, 1922): synonym of Orania fusulus (Brocchi, 1814)
 Muricopsis apiculata Dautzenberg, 1917: synonym of Ocinebrina edwardsii (Payraudeau, 1826): synonym of Ocenebra edwardsii (Payraudeau, 1826) 
 Muricopsis aradasii(Poirier, 1883)  synonym of Murexsul aradasii (Monterosato in Poirier, 1883)
 Muricopsis atra F. Nordsieck, 1972: synonym of Muricopsis cristata (Brocchi, 1814)
 Muricopsis blainvillii(Payraudeau, 1826): synonym of Muricopsis cristata (Brocchi, 1814)
 Muricopsis carnicolorBozzetti, 2009: synonym of Orania carnicolor (Bozzetti, 2009)
 Muricopsis carvalhoi Cox, 1936 †: synonym of Ocinebrina carvalhoi (Cox, 1936) †
 Muricopsis cevikeri Houart, 2000: synonym of Murexsul cevikeri (Houart, 2000) (original combination)
 Muricopsis cristatus (Brocchi, 1814): synonym of Muricopsis cristata (Brocchi, 1814)
 Muricopsis diadema  (Aradas & Benoit, 1876): synonym of Murexsul aradasii (Monterosato in Poirier, 1883)
 Muricopsis duffyi Petuch, 1992: synonym of Murexsul huberti (Radwin & D'Attilio, 1976) 
 Muricopsis edwardsii (Payraudeau, 1826): synonym of Ocinebrina edwardsii (Payraudeau, 1826): synonym of Ocenebra edwardsii (Payraudeau, 1826) 
 Muricopsis erroneus (Monterosato in Poirier, 1883): synonym of Ocinebrina hispidula (Pallary, 1904): synonym of Ocenebra hispidula (Pallary, 1904)
 Muricopsis glutinosa Palazzi & Villari, 2001: synonym of Muricopsis cristata (Brocchi, 1814) (dubious synonym)
 Muricopsis hexagonus (Lamarck, 1816): synonym of Murexsul hexagonus (Lamarck, 1816): synonym of Murexsul pacaudi Van Hyfte & Danvin, 2018 
 Muricopsis hispida Monterosato in Coen, 1933: synonym of Muricopsis cristata (Brocchi, 1814) 
 Muricopsis hispidula (Pallary, 1904): synonym of Ocenebra hispidula (Pallary, 1904)
 Muricopsis hispidulus (Pallary, 1904): synonym of Ocenebra hispidula (Pallary, 1904)
 Muricopsis huberti Radwin & D'Attilio, 1976: synonym of Murexsul huberti (Radwin & D'Attilio, 1976) (original combination)
 Muricopsis hubrechti Bozzetti, 2018: synonym of Orania corallina (Melvill & Standen, 1903)
 Muricopsis ianlochiHouart, 1987: synonym of Murexsul ianlochi (Houart, 1987)
 Muricopsis inermis (Philippi, 1836): synonym of Muricopsis cristata (Brocchi, 1814)
 Muricopsis jaliscoensis Radwin & D'Attilio, 1970: synonym of Murexsul jaliscoensis (Radwin & D'Attilio, 1970) (original combination)
 Muricopsis lyonsi Petuch, 1986: synonym of Murexsul oxytatus (M. Smith, 1938)
 Muricopsis mariae (Finlay, 1930): synonym of Murexsul mariae Finlay, 1930
 Muricopsis mariangelaeRolán & F. Fernandes, 1991: synonym of Muricopsis rutila mariangelae Rolan & Fernandes, 1991
 Muricopsis mbotyiensis Houart, 1991: synonym of Murexsul mbotyiensis (Houart, 1991) (original combination)
 Muricopsis medicago (R. B. Watson, 1897) : synonym of Murexsul aradasii (Monterosato in Poirier, 1883) 
 Muricopsis noduliferus (G. B. Sowerby II, 1841): synonym of Attiliosa nodulifera (G. B. Sowerby II, 1841)
 Muricopsis nothokieneri (E. H. Vokes, 1978): synonym of Murexsul nothokieneri E. H. Vokes, 1978
 Muricopsis octogonus (Quoy & Gaimard, 1833): synonym of Murexsul octogonus (Quoy & Gaimard, 1833)
 Muricopsis oliverai Kosuge, 1984: synonym of Paziella oliverai (Kosuge, 1984): synonym of Flexopteron oliverai (Kosuge, 1984) (original combination)
 Muricopsis orri Cernohorsky, 1976: synonym of Attiliosa orri (Cernohorsky, 1976) (original combination)
 Muricopsis ostrearum (Conrad, 1846): synonym of Calotrophon ostrearum (Conrad, 1846)
 Muricopsis oxossi Petuch, 1979: synonym of Pygmaepterys oxossi (Petuch, 1979) (original combination)
 Muricopsis oxytatus (M. Smith, 1938): synonym of Murexsul oxytatus (M. Smith, 1938)
 Muricopsis personatus Monterosato in Settepassi, 1977: synonym of Ocinebrina hispidula (Pallary, 1904): synonym of Ocenebra hispidula (Pallary, 1904) (unavailable following ICZN art. 11.4)
 Muricopsis poeyi Sarasúa & Espinosa, 1979: synonym of Attiliosa poeyi (Sarasúa & Espinosa, 1979) (original combination)
 Muricopsis profunda B. A. Marshall & K. W. Burch, 2000: synonym of Murexsul profundus (B. A. Marshall & K. W. Burch, 2000) (original combination)
 Muricopsis purpurispina Ponder, 1972: synonym of Murexsul purpurispinus (Ponder, 1972) (original combination)
 Muricopsis richardbinghami Petuch, 1987: synonym of Pygmaepterys richardbinghami (Petuch, 1987) (original combination)
 Muricopsis roseus (Reeve, 1846): synonym of Muricopsis rosea (Reeve, 1846) (wrong gender agreement of specific epithet)
 Muricopsis scotti B. A. Marshall & K. W. Burch, 2000: synonym of Rolandiella scotti (B. A. Marshall & K. W. Burch, 2000) 
 Muricopsis skoglundae B. W. Myers, Hertz & D'Attilio, 1993: synonym of Murexsul skoglundae (B. W. Myers, Hertz & D'Attilio, 1993) (original combination)
 Muricopsis spiculus Houart, 1987: synonym of Murexsul spiculus (Houart, 1987) (original combination)
 Muricopsis spinulosa Stalio in Coen, 1933: synonym of Muricopsis blainvillii var. spinulosa Stalio in Coen, 1933: synonym of Muricopsis cristata (Brocchi, 1814)
 Muricopsis spinulosa (Costa O.G., 1861): synonym of Muricopsis aradasii (Poirier, 1883): synonym of Murexsul aradasii (Monterosato, 1883)
 Muricopsis sunderlandi Petuch, 1987: synonym of Murexsul sunderlandi (Petuch, 1987) (original combination)
 Muricopsis tenellus Monterosato in Settepassi, 1977: synonym of Ocinebrina hybrida (Aradas & Benoit, 1876): synonym of Ocenebra hybrida (Aradas & Benoit, 1876) (unavailable following ICZN art. 11.4)
 Muricopsis tokubeii (Nakamigawa & Habe, 1964): synonym of Murexsul tokubeii Nakamigawa & Habe, 1964 
 Muricopsis tulensis Radwin & D'Attilio, 1976: synonym of Murexsul tulensis (Radwin & D'Attilio, 1976) (original combination)
 Muricopsis warreni Petuch, 1993: synonym of Murexsul warreni (Petuch, 1993) (original combination)
 Muricopsis zylmanae Petuch, 1993: synonym of Murexsul zylmanae (Petuch, 1993) (original combination)

The Indo-Pacific Molluscan database also mentions the following species with names in current use (those not mentioned here can be found in the genera Murexsul, Favartia and Rolandiella)  
 Muricopsis ednae (M. Smith, 1940) : synonym of Murexsul interserratus (Sowerby, 1879) 
 Muricopsis espinosus (Hutton, 1886) : synonym of Murexsul espinosus Hutton, 1886 
 Muricopsis espinosus mariae (Finlay, 1930) : synonym of Murexsul mariae Finlay, 1930  
 Muricopsis oliverai Kosuge, 1984: synonym of Poirieria (Flexopteron) oliverai (Kosuge, 1984)
 Muricopsis oxytata (M. Smith, 1938) - hexagonal murex : synonym of Murexsul oxytatus (M. Smith, 1938) 
 Muricopsis planilirata (Reeve, 1845): synonym of Murexsul planiliratus (Reeve, 1845)

References

 
 Powell A W B, New Zealand Mollusca, William Collins Publishers Ltd, Auckland, New Zealand 1979 
 Glen Pownall, New Zealand Shells and Shellfish, Seven Seas Publishing Pty Ltd, Wellington, New Zealand 1979 
 Houart R. (2012) Description of Muricopsis (Muricopsis) gorii (Gastropoda: Muricidae: Muricopsinae) from southern São Tomé. Novapex 13(1): 37-41. [10 March 2012]

External links
 Dautzenberg P. & Dollfus G. (1882-1886). Les mollusques marins du Roussillon. Tome Ier. Gastropodes. Paris: Baillière & fils. 570 pp., 66 pls.
 Olsson A.A. & McGinty T.L. (1958). Recent marine mollusks from the Caribbean Coast of Panama with the description of some new genera and species. Bulletins of American Paleontology. 39(177): 1-58.

 
Muricopsinae
Taxonomy articles created by Polbot
Gastropod genera